The Silver City Historic District is a historically significant section of downtown Silver City, New Mexico, United States.

Description
The properties include some of Silver City's most significant commercial, government, religious, and residential buildings. The commercial area is mainly located along Broadway and Bullard Street; most of the commercial buildings are two-story brick structures, and many feature cast iron storefronts. The Grant County Courthouse, which was designed and built in 1930, is located at the end of Broadway. The houses in the district are also mainly brick, a locally abundant building material; they represent a variety of architectural styles, including a number of Second Empire works. Five churches are included in the district; these include Gothic Revival and Mission Revival designs.

The historic district was added to the National Register of Historic Places in 1978.

The Grant County Courthouse, built in 1930, includes a mural by Santa Fe artist Theodore Van Soelen.

See also

 National Register of Historic Places listings in Grant County, New Mexico

References

External links

Geography of Grant County, New Mexico
Historic districts on the National Register of Historic Places in New Mexico
National Register of Historic Places in Grant County, New Mexico